Arden is a village on the southwest shore of Loch Lomond in Argyll and Bute, Scotland.

References

Villages in Argyll and Bute